Oladyi ( pl., diminutive: оладушки, oladushki, sg. оладья, oladya, oladky) are small thick pancakes or fritters common in Russian cuisines, Ukrainian cuisines. The batter for oladyi is made from wheat or (nowadays more rarely) buckwheat flour, eggs, milk, salt and sugar with yeast or baking soda. The batter may also be based on kefir, soured milk or yoghurt. It may contain various additions, such as apple or raisins.

Oladki are usually served with smetana (sour cream), as well as with sweet toppings such as jam, powidl, honey etc. Savoury versions may be served with caviar, similarly to blini.

Generally, the term oladki in Eastern Slavic cuisines may also denote fritters made with other ingredients, e.g. potato pancakes (картофельные оладьи), carrot fritters (морковные оладьи), bean pancakes (оладьи из бобовых), rice pancakes (рисовые оладьи), summer squash fritters (кабачковые оладьи) etc. Syrniki (tvorog  pancakes) may also be considered a type of oladyi.

Etymology 

The Old East Slavic word oladya as a proper noun is first attested in 1470. As a dish it is first mentioned in Domostroy, the 16th-century Russian book of household rules, instructions and advice. The word derives from Ancient Greek ἐλάδιον, diminutive of ἔλαιον, "olive oil", "oily substance".

References

Sources 
  []
 
 
 
  A Gift to Young Housewives, English translation (shortened): 
 
 

Belarusian cuisine
Russian cuisine
Ukrainian cuisine
Soviet cuisine
Pancakes